Jordi Lardín Cruz (born 4 June 1973) is a Spanish retired footballer who played mostly as a winger.

Over the course of eight seasons, he amassed La Liga totals of 200 games and 44 goals with Espanyol and Atlético Madrid.

Career
Born in Manresa, Barcelona, Catalonia, Lardín was a skilled and pacy attacking player with netting ability. He started playing football with local CE Manresa, making his professional debuts with RCD Espanyol also in his native region in 1992–93; the team would be relegated from La Liga, and he went on to become an essential offensive figure in the following years.

From 1994 to 1996, as the Pericos reached the UEFA Cup in one season, narrowly missing on qualification in another, Lardín scored 29 goals in 76 league games under the guidance of José Antonio Camacho. In the latter campaign, he found the net in both games against Real Madrid for 3–1 and 2–1 wins.

For the 1997–98 season, Lardín signed with Atlético Madrid for 1.500 million pesetas, but would only appear significantly throughout his first year. A serious car accident in October 1997 would not prevent his Spanish national team debut one month later, a 1–1 friendly match against Romania in Palma, Majorca.

After unassuming loan stints with former club Espanyol and Xerez CD in Segunda División, Lardín retired from football at age 29 claiming to be "fed up" with the sport. He made a tentative comeback two years later, with modest CD Leganés; internationally, he also appeared for Spain at the 1996 Summer Olympics, playing in all the matches as the national side reached the quarter-finals in Atlanta.

On 28 November 2016, Lardín left his post as Espanyol's youth football coordinator and was appointed its director of football.

Honours
Espanyol
Segunda División: 1993–94

Spain U21
UEFA European Under-21 Championship: Runner-up 1996

References

External links
 
 
 

1973 births
Living people
Footballers from Manresa
Spanish footballers
Association football wingers
La Liga players
Segunda División players
Segunda División B players
Primera Catalana players
CE Manresa players
RCD Espanyol footballers
CE L'Hospitalet players
Atlético Madrid footballers
Xerez CD footballers
CD Leganés players
Spain under-21 international footballers
Spain under-23 international footballers
Spain international footballers
Olympic footballers of Spain
Footballers at the 1996 Summer Olympics